The 1951–52 season was the 52n season in the history of Berner Sport Club Young Boys. The team played their home games at Stadion Wankdorf in Bern.

Players
 Gianfranco de Taddeo
 Hans Flühmann
 Werner Zehnder
 Louis Casali
 Charles Casali
 Albert Sing
 Gottlieb Stäuble
 Hans Grütter
 Otto Häuptli
 Eugen Meier
 Heinz Bigler

Competitions

Overall record

Nationalliga A

League table

Matches

Swiss Cup

References

BSC Young Boys seasons
Swiss football clubs 1951–52 season